= Karl Wichmann =

Karl Wichmann (1868–1948) was a German literary scholar, who served as professor of German at the University of Sheffield from 1901 to 1907, and then at the University of Birmingham from 1907 to 1917. His dismissal from Birmingham in the midst of the First World War has been the subject of scholarship.
